T. Venkataramanaiah (born May 4, 1960), also referred to as Appakaranahalli Venkatesh is an Indian politician, currently serving as a member of the Karnataka Legislative Assembly from Doddaballapur constituency, since 2013. He is a member of the Indian National Congress party.

Early life
T. Venkataramanaiah was born to Timmaiah and Ganga Hanumakka in Appakaranahalli village in Doddaballapur taluk on 4 May 1960. He is also known as Appakaranahalli Venkatesh. He was born into a poverty ridden undivided family of 30 members.

Education
He completed his primary and high school education in Hulikunte village in Doddaballapur taluk. He completed SSLC  and joined Nelamangala PU college.

Marriage
He married Varalakshmi in 1989. The couple have three children: Thilak, Kiran and Jeevitha.

Political life
He campaigned for his mother in the Mandal Panchayat election for the first time and played a vital role in her victory. That victory was like a political debut for himself. From that point onwards he was involved in various social services and quickly became popular. He contested for the MLA election from Doddaballapur constituency for the first time in 2013 and secured a surprise victory over many political bigwigs. Later he was re-elected in 2018 from Doddaballapur.

References

1960 births
Living people
Indian National Congress politicians from Karnataka
People from Chikkaballapur
Karnataka MLAs 2018–2023
Karnataka MLAs 2013–2018